East Hill Historic District is a national historic district located at Ithaca in Tompkins County, New York. The district consists of 263 contributing buildings and one contributing structure. It contains the greatest concentration of Ithaca's architecturally and historically significant buildings and has retained the architectural integrity of the 1870-1920 period.

It was listed on the National Register of Historic Places in 1986.

See also
National Register of Historic Places listings in Tompkins County, New York

References

External links

 Lower East Hill Historic District Tour

Historic districts on the National Register of Historic Places in New York (state)
Historic districts in Tompkins County, New York
Buildings and structures in Ithaca, New York
National Register of Historic Places in Tompkins County, New York